The Deputy Commandant for Aviation (DCA) is the United States Marine Corps' principal advisor on all aviation matters and is the spokesperson for Marine Corps Aviation programs, requirements, and strategy throughout the Department of the Navy and the Department of Defense. DCA is normally the highest-ranking naval aviator in the Marine Corps and reports directly to the Commandant of the Marine Corps.  The role of DCA is an administrative position and has no operational command authority over United States Marine Corps Aviation forces.

DCA tour lengths have varied over the years based on war time requirements and personnel turnover.  For the last two decades, typical tour lengths have been approximately three years.  The billet is normally held by a lieutenant general.  DCA and Headquarters Marine Corps Aviation work out of The Pentagon in Arlington County, Virginia.

Responsibilities
The Deputy Commandant for Aviation is responsible for developing, integrating, and supervising plans, policies, and budgets for all aviation assets and aviation expeditionary enablers (aviation command and control, aviation-ground support, and unmanned aircraft systems) in support of Marine air ground task forces.

History
The Aviation Section, Headquarters Marine Corps was established in 1919.  In charge initially was the Officer in Charge, Aviation.  He was responsible to both the Commandant of the Marine Corps and the Director of Naval Aviation for all Marine Corps related aviation matters.  In 1920, Congress authorized Marine Corps Aviation to maintain a strength of approximately one-fifth the size of the Marine Corps.  In 1936 the Aviation Section was renamed the Aviation Division and the billet was changed to the Director of Aviation. In 1962 the name was again changed to Deputy Chief of Staff (Air).  The current moniker of Deputy Commandant for Aviation began in Jun 1998.

List of Deputy Commandants for Aviation

Timeline

Citations

References

 
 
 
 
 

United States Marine Corps lists
United States Marine Corps aviation
United States Marine Corps leadership